David Michael Greene (born 26 October 1973) is an Irish former footballer who played as a defender.

Career
Born in Luton, England to a Galway mother and a Dublin father, Greene played for the Republic of Ireland U21 side 14 times. He began his career at hometown club Luton Town, where he spent five years, making just 19 league appearances. Then manager David Pleat's move from Kenilworth Road to take over at Sheffield Wednesday brought Greene into immediate conflict with the new Luton manager, Terry Westley. Greene was loaned out twice during his time with Luton, firstly to Colchester United and then to Brentford. He was sold to Colchester for £30,000 in 1996, and went on to make over 150 league appearances, being named Player of the Year in two consecutive years. Greene moved on to play for Cardiff City in 2000, making 10 league appearances, and made a solitary league appearance for Cambridge United in 2001 before retiring through injury.

Honours

Club
Colchester United
 Football League Third Division Playoff Winner (1): 1997–98
 Football League Trophy Runner-up (1): 1996–97

Individual
 Colchester United Player of the Year (2): 1999, 2000

References

External links
 
 
 David Greene at Coludata.co.uk
 

1973 births
Living people
Republic of Ireland association footballers
Luton Town F.C. players
Colchester United F.C. players
Brentford F.C. players
Cardiff City F.C. players
Cambridge United F.C. players
Woking F.C. players
Dagenham & Redbridge F.C. players
Slough Town F.C. players
Footballers from Luton
Republic of Ireland under-21 international footballers
Association football defenders